Andreas Nærstad (5 March 1920 – 25 September 1983) was a Norwegian sports administrator.

With a background in ski jumping, he served as president of the Norwegian Ski Federation from 1970 to 1974. He also chaired the football department of Strømmen IF. Outside of sports, he worked as an accountant.

References

1920 births
1983 deaths
Norwegian sports executives and administrators
People from Skedsmo